The 2005 Bavaria World Darts Trophy was the fourth edition of the World Darts Trophy, a professional darts tournament held at the De Vechtsebanen in Utrecht, the Netherlands, run by the British Darts Organisation and the World Darts Federation.

The 2004 winner and BDO World Champion, Raymond van Barneveld was knocked out in straight sets in the second round by Martin Atkins in the men's event. In the final, Gary Robson defeated Mervyn King, 6–4 in sets, winning his only major title to date. Karin Krappen beat Trina Gulliver, the BDO World Champion, in the semi-finals and Francis Hoenselaar, the 2004 winner and in her third straight final, in the final to win the women's event, 3–1 in sets. This was the last year for the women's event.

Seeds

Men
  Raymond van Barneveld
  Martin Adams
  Mervyn King
  Ted Hankey
  Tony West
  Tony O'Shea
  Vincent van der Voort
  Tony Eccles

Prize money

Men

Men's tournament

Women's tournament

Television coverage 
The tournament was broadcast by SBS6 in the Netherlands, but was not shown in the UK. An internet feed from SBS was available. However, this may be restricted to the Netherlands only due to contractual restrictions.

References 

World Darts Trophy
World Darts Trophy
2005 in Dutch sport